Under the Streetlight is the thirteenth studio album by American R&B group Boyz II Men. It was released by Tango Entertainment, Masterworks and MSM Music Group on October 20, 2017. A collection of interpretations of songs from the 1950s, along with one original track, "Ladies Man," the album debuted and peaked at number 59 on the US Current Album Sales chart.

Critical reception

Associated Press critic Mark Kennedy found that Under the Streetlight "manages to give each song the Boyz' soulful barbershop quartet treatment with respect and admiration for the originals, especially with a superb version of "Why Do Fools Fall in Love" [...] The Boyz may be all grown up but their skills clearly haven’t been lost." Renowned for Sound remarked that "the Men still have a solid grasp of harmony and the tightly polished ability that comes from 30 years of performing. With an array of guest performers, [...] they prove that age hasn’t dulled their harmonic abilities. The album treads a pleasant enough path, but risks alienating long-term fans eager for something a bit more contemporary."

Chart performance
Under the Streetlight debuted at number 59 on the US Billboard Current Album Sales chart in the week ending November 11, 2017. The album failed to enter the US Billboard 200 and the Top R&B/Hip-Hop Albums chart, becoming the band's first album to miss both charts.

Track listing

Charts

Release history

References

2017 albums
Boyz II Men albums